Thomas Bromley, 2nd Baron Montfort, also known as Lord Montford, (January 1733 – 24 October 1799), was a British politician.

Bromley was the only son and heir of Henry Bromley, 1st Baron Montfort and Frances Wyndham, daughter of Thomas Wyndham and sister and heiress of Sir Francis Wyndham, 4th Baronet of Trent, Somerset. He was returned to Parliament as one of the two representatives for Cambridge in 1754, a seat he held until the following year, when he entered the House of Lords at the age of 21 after his father had committed suicide.  His seat in the Commons passed in an uncontested election to his brother-in-law Charles Cadogan, who was later raised in the peerage himself as the 1st Earl Cadogan.

He bought a seven-bedroom home in Sunbury on Thames facing the Thames to serve as his home whilst on business in London in 1783.  The house was later acquired by Captain Lendy and has become Lendy Place.  An adjoining road built on part of its gardens is named Montford Close.

He died in October 1799, aged 66, and was succeeded in the barony by his only son, Henry. Lord Montfort had married Mary Anne Blake, sister of MP Sir Patrick Blake, 1st Baronet, of Langham, Suffolk at Marylebone in 1772.

References

 

1733 births
1799 deaths
2
Members of the Parliament of Great Britain for English constituencies
British MPs 1754–1761